The 2010s in food in the United States describes food trends that are characteristic of the 2010s decade. Many of the trends are a direct result of related social or economic events.

Trends

Gluten-free diets became popular. Fusion cuisine offered a new twist on many traditional food items. An interest in local and organic foods carried over from the mid to late 2000s as a part of green and sustainable living. There was an increase in the number of vegetarians and vegans. The Economist declared 2019 "the year of the vegan." Spicy foods were popular, sometimes in new ways. Finger foods such as hors d'oeuvres and tapas were applied to many desserts and comfort foods. Chipotle's success caused its fast casual made-to-order business model to carry over to many other food categories. Food presentation became more important as social media caused an increase in food photography and sharing. In the United States, soda sales dipped in favor of healthier options, such as sparkling water. Energy drink sales experienced substantially higher growth than coffee. Caffeinated products spilled over to things like gum and mints. The 2010s also saw significant early stage developments in cultured meat, a form of cellular agriculture whereby animal cells are cultured in order to grow meat without the need to raise and slaughter animals. This technology also saw substantial investment from billionaire entrepreneurs such as Richard Branson. Waste and resource-conscious chefs also saw a spread of zero waste cooking.

List of popular foods

List of popular drinks

Foodservice 

Online food ordering and Food trucks increase in popularity. Chipotle's success caused its fast casual made-to-order business model to carry over to many other food categories.

Events

Releases

Incorporations

References 

2010s in food
Food